Paulson was an indie rock band from Midland Park, New Jersey.


History
Paulson was formed in 2001. The band has released records on four different labels. Both Variations and All at Once have been released twice. The versions of All at Once do vary in production, track order, and songs. However Variations is simply a re-release of the original (due to Initial Records going out of business). Variations features an art punk sound and much experimentation, while All at Once showcases Paulson's melodic indie rock songs. Paulson had a strong DIY ethic, and has been played on MTVU. In 2008 the band disbanded due to troubles in following career paths outside of music.

Discography

Albums/EPs

External links
Official MySpace Page
Official PureVolume Page
Soundcrank Podcast Hosted by Paulson

Musical groups from New Jersey
People from Midland Park, New Jersey
Musical groups established in 2001
Musical groups disestablished in 2008
Doghouse Records artists